John Wodehouse, 2nd Baron Wodehouse (11 January 1771 – 31 May 1846), styled The Honourable John Wodehouse from 1797 to 1834, was a British peer and Member of Parliament.

Background
Wodehouse was the eldest son of John Wodehouse, 1st Baron Wodehouse and Sophia Berkeley.

Political career
Wodehouse was elected to the House of Commons for Great Bedwyn in 1796, a seat he held until 1802. In the general election that year he stood for Norfolk, but was defeated by Thomas Coke and Sir Jacob Astley; he was likewise defeated by Coke and William Windham in the 1806 election. He was appointed Lord Lieutenant of Norfolk in 1821. He later represented Marlborough from 1818 to 1826. In 1834 he succeeded his father in the barony and entered the House of Lords as a Conservative. Wodehouse was a Peelite, and gave his proxy to the ministry to vote for repeal of the Corn Laws in the Lords shortly before his death.

Family
Lord Wodehouse married Charlotte Laura Norris, daughter of John Norris, of Witton Park, Norfolk, in 1796. They had eleven children:

 Norris John Wodehouse (May 1798 – 25 May 1819)
 Henry Wodehouse (1799 – 29 April 1834), married Anne Gurdon and left two sons:
 John Wodehouse, 1st Earl of Kimberley (1826–1902)
 Henry Wodehouse (27 May 1834 – 20 August 1873) was granted the rank of a baron's younger son in 1847. He married Mary Livingstone King, daughter of John Pendleton King, left no children. His widow later married Henry Paget, 4th Marquess of Anglesey 
 Sophia Laura Wodehouse (13 January 1801 – 1869), married Raikes Currie in 1825
 Vice-Admiral Edward Thornton-Wodehouse (5 June 1802 – 17 March 1874), RN, married Diana Thornton and left children
 Charlotte Laura Wodehouse (2 September 1803 – 1878), married Rev. Richard Phayre, left no children
  Henrietta Laura Wodehouse (30 March 1805 – aft. 1890), married John David Chambers in 1834
 Captain Berkeley Wodehouse (14 May 1806 – 13 September 1877), married Fanny Holmes and left children
 Caroline Elizabeth Laura (29 December 1810 – 1856), married John Whaites in 1836 and left children
 Cornet Bertram Wodehouse (30 April 1813 – 11 October 1856)
 Reverend Alfred Wodehouse (10 June 1814 – 6 September 1848), married Emma Hamilton Macdonald in 1840 and left children
 Emma Laura Wodehouse (d. 1820)

He died in 1846, aged 76, and was succeeded in the barony by his grandson John, who became a prominent Liberal politician and was created Earl of Kimberley in 1866.

Notes

References 
Kidd, Charles, Williamson, David (editors). Debrett's Peerage and Baronetage (1990 edition). New York: St Martin's Press, 1990.

External links
 

|-

1771 births
1846 deaths
12
British MPs 1796–1800
Lord-Lieutenants of Norfolk
Members of the Parliament of Great Britain for English constituencies
Members of the Parliament of the United Kingdom for English constituencies
UK MPs 1801–1802
UK MPs 1818–1820
UK MPs 1820–1826
UK MPs who inherited peerages
John Wodehouse, 2nd Baron Wodehouse
Tory MPs (pre-1834)